The 2022–23 Central Connecticut Blue Devils women's basketball team will represent Central Connecticut State University in the 2022–23 NCAA Division I women's basketball season. The Blue Devils, led by 3rd-year head coach Kerri Reeves, will play their home games at the William H. Detrick Gymnasium in New Britain, Connecticut as members of the Northeast Conference.

Previous season
The Blue Devils finished the 2021–22 season 6–20, 4–12 in NEC play to finish in eighth place.

Roster

Schedule and results

|-
!colspan=12 style=| Non-conference regular season

|-
!colspan=12 style=| Northeast Conference regular season

|-
!colspan=12 style=| Northeast Conference tournament

Sources

References

Central Connecticut Blue Devils women's basketball seasons
Central Connecticut Blue Devils
Central Connecticut Blue Devils
Central Connecticut Blue Devils